Budge Budge Assembly constituency is a Legislative Assembly constituency of South 24 Parganas district in the Indian State of West Bengal.

Overview
As per order of the Delimitation Commission in respect of the Delimitation of constituencies in the West Bengal, Budge Budge  Assembly constituency is composed of the following:
 Budge Budge Municipality
 Pujali Municipality
 Budge Budge I community development block
 Kashipur Alampur, North Bowali, South Bowali and Dongaria Roypur gram panchayats of Budge Budge II community development block

Budge Budge Assembly constituency is a part of No. 21 Diamond Harbour (Lok Sabha constituency).

Members of Legislative Assembly

Election Results

Legislative Assembly Election 2011

Legislative Assembly Elections 1977-2006
In 2006 and 2001 , Ashok Kumar Deb of AITC & in 1996, from INC won the Budge Budge Assembly constituency defeating his nearest rivals Ratan Bagchi of CPI(M) in 2006, Kali Bhandari of CPI(M) in 2001 and Dipak Mukherjee of CPI(M) in 1996. Dipak Mukherjee of CPI(M) defeated Ashok Kumar Deb of INC in 1991. Kshitibhusan Roy Barman of CPI(M) defeated Lal Bahadur Singh of INC in 1987, Nimai Chand Kanra of INC in 1982 and Bipulananda of INC in 1977.

Legislative Assembly Elections 1952-1972
Kshitibhusan Roy Barman of CPI(M) won in 1972, 1971, 1969 and 1967. Hiralal Halder of INC won in 1962. Bankim Mukherjee of CPI won in 1957 and 1952.

References

Notes

Citations

Assembly constituencies of West Bengal
Politics of South 24 Parganas district